Gaston Essengué (born October 10, 1983) is a Cameroonian basketball power forward with Club Atletico Quilmes in the Argentina National League. He is also a member of the Cameroon national basketball team. Essengué first attended Compton College and Weatherford College in Texas, where he graduated from in 2005. He then transferred to UNLV, from where he graduated in 2007.

Essengué joined Venados de Mazatlán in 2022.

References

External links
Profile at eurobasket.com
 Interview Las Vegas Sun, 3 January 2006
 UNLV Runnin’ Rebels bio

1983 births
Living people
Cameroonian expatriate basketball people in Mexico
Cameroonian expatriate basketball people in the United States
Cameroonian expatriate sportspeople in Turkey
Cameroonian men's basketball players
Centers (basketball)
Club San Martín de Corrientes basketball players
Dutch Basketball League players
Junior college men's basketball players in the United States
KB Prishtina players
Power forwards (basketball)
Quilmes de Mar del Plata basketball players
Basketball players from Yaoundé
UNLV Runnin' Rebels basketball players
Venados de Mazatlán (basketball) players
Weatherford College alumni
West-Brabant Giants players